Patric Juillet is an Australian chef and film producer. He was married to Wendy Hughes, and produced several of her films.
Children = Jay Juillet , Dominic Juillet, Gabriella Juillet, Raphaella Juillet , Michaela Juillet

Select credits
Man of Flowers (1983) - assistant to director
Unfinished Business (1985 Australian film) - associate producer
Remember Me (1985) (TV movie) - producer
Pandemonium (1987) - executive producer
Warm Nights on a Slow Moving Train (1988) - producer
Boundaries of the Heart (1988) - producer
Luigi's Ladies (1989) - producer

References

Year of birth missing (living people)
Living people
Australian film producers